Liam Kennedy is an Irish historian, emeritus professor of history at Queen's University, Belfast.

Biography
Liam Kennedy was born in rural Tipperary, Ireland.

In 2005, Kennedy stood against Gerry Adams as an independent candidate for Belfast West, to protest against IRA violence especially paramilitary punishment attacks. He finished last, with 147 votes. He has called for a commission of inquiry into punishment attacks, which he considers a form of child abuse, considering that many victims are minors and some younger than 14. According to Kennedy, Sinn Féin is involved in  the attacks, which the party denies.

Kennedy's look at Irish history, Unhappy the Land: The Most Oppressed People Ever, the Irish? was published in 2016.

References

External links

 Personal website

21st-century Irish historians
Living people
Year of birth missing (living people)
People from County Tipperary
Academics of Queen's University Belfast
Revisionist historians (Ireland)